Tides of Tomorrow is an EP by alternative rock band Cave In, released through Hydra Head Records on October 15, 2002.

Track listing

Chart positions

Personnel
Cave In
Stephen Brodsky – vocals, guitar
Adam McGrath – guitar, bongos
Caleb Scofield – bass, vocals
John-Robert Conners – drums

References

Cave In albums
2002 EPs
Hydra Head Records EPs